My best Friend Daadu is a 2023 Indian Gujarati family drama film directed by Jashwant Gangani, starring Umang Acharya, Urvashi Harsora, Vishal Thakkar and Prashant Barot in lead role.

Cast 
 Umang Acharya
 Urvashi Harsora 
 Vishal Thakkar 
 Prashant Barot

Production 
My best Friend Daadu was Produced by Jashwant Gangani

External links

References

2023 films
2020s Gujarati-language films
Indian drama films
Films set in Gujarat
Gujarati-language films